Mart Taniel (born 11 August 1976 in Tallinn) is an Estonian cinematographer and film director. 

2000-2005 he studied at Tallinn University in operator speciality.

Filmography
 2006 "Tühirand"
 2006 "Müümise kunst" 
 2007 "Jan Uuspõld läheb Tartusse" 
 2007 "Sügisball"
 2009 "Püha Tõnu kiusamine" 
 2013 "Free Range" 
 2015 "1944" 
 2017 "November"
 2021 "Captain Volkonogov Escaped"

References

External links 

Living people
1976 births
Estonian cinematographers
Estonian film directors
Tallinn University alumni
People from Tallinn